This is a list of films about the punk subculture and/or the music genre.

0-9
24 Hour Party People (2002)

A
Arada (2018) - Mu Tunc
Afro-punk (2005, documentary)
American Hardcore (2006, documentary) - Paul Rachman
Another State of Mind (1984, documentary)

B
Bad Boy Bubby (1993) - Rolf de Heer
A Band Called Death (2012 documentary)
Bhakti Boy (2015) - Joy Marzec
The Blank Generation (1976, documentary) - Amos Poe
Blank Generation (1980) - Ulli Lommel
Blitzkrieg Bop (1978)
Big Time: Punk in Belfast  (2006)  - Roy Wallace
Bilo jednom... (2006, documentary)
Bloody Bloody Belgium  (2014)  - Roy Wallace
Border Radio (1987)
Botinada: A Origem do Punk no Brasil (2006) - Gastão Moreira
Bomb City (2017, drama, real story)
Breaking Glass (1980)
Brothers of the Head (2005) - Brian Aldiss
Bullet in a Bible (2006, documentary)
Burst City (1982)
Black and White Statement (1980 documentary VPRO ) by Dick Rijneke & Mildred van Leeuwaarden.

C
Cha Cha (1979) - Herman Brood
The Clash: Westway to the World (2000, documentary)
Class of 1984 (1982)
Class of Nuke 'Em High (1986)
Control (2007) - Anton Corbijn
Crash 'n' Burn (1977 short film) - Ross McLaren
Crazy Thunder Road (1980)

D
The Day the Country Died (2007, documentary) - Roy Wallace
A Day in the Life  (2003) - Stratford Mercenaries, Roy Wallace
The Decline of Western Civilization (1981, documentary) - Penelope Spheeris
The Decline of Western Civilization III (1998, documentary) - Penelope Spheeris
Dečko Koji Obećava (1981, Yugoslavia)
Desperate Teenage Lovedolls (1984) - David Markey
D.O.A.: A Rite of Passage (1981, documentary) - Lech Kowalski
Dogs in Space (1986)

E
Ebba the Movie (1982, documentary)
End of the Century: The Story of the Ramones (2004, documentary)
Engel & Joe (2001) - Vanessa Jopp
Ex Drummer (2007) - Koen Mortier

F
The Filth and the Fury (2000, documentary) - Julien Temple
Finding Joseph I: The HR From Bad Brains Documentary (2017, documentary)
Fokofpolisiekar: Forgive Them for They Know Not What They Do (2009, documentary)
F*cking Åmål (1998, Sweden) - Lukas Moodysson

G
Garage Days (2002) - Alex Proyas
Gleaming the Cube  (1989)
Rise Against: Generation Lost (2006, documentary)
Glory Daze (1996) (Ben Affleck)
Glue (2006) (Alexis Dos Santos)
Good Vibrations (2013)
The Great Rock 'n' Roll Swindle (1980) - Julien Temple
Groeten uit Rotterdam (1980 documentary VPRO) By Dick Rijneke & Mildred van Leeuwaarden
Green Room (2015)

H
Hard Core Logo (1996) - Bruce McDonald
Hated: GG Allin and the Murder Junkies (1994, documentary) - Todd Phillips
How to Talk to Girls at Parties (2017) - John Cameron Mitchell
Hype! (1996, documentary) - Doug Pray
Huize Schoonderloo (1980, documentary) - Dick Rijneke

I
I Believe - in Buzzcock (tbr) - Roy Wallace
Inner Terrestrials   (2010) - Roy Wallace
Instrument (1998, documentary) - Jem Cohen

J
Jesus Christ Vampire Hunter (2002) - Lee Demarbre
Joe Strummer: The Future Is Unwritten (2007, documentary) - Julien Temple
Jubilee (1977) - Derek Jarman

K
King of Punk (2007, documentary) - Kenneth van Schooten and Julie van Schooten

L
Ladies and Gentlemen, The Fabulous Stains (1981)
The Last Pogo (1978, documentary) - Colin Brunton
Let Them Know: The Story of Youth Brigade and BYO Records (2011)
Liquid Sky (1982)
The Little Punker  (1992) - Michael Schaack
Loren Cass (2006)
 Los Bastardos (2009) - Gestapo Khazi
The Lost Boys (1987)
Lovedolls Superstar (1986) - David Markey
Luster (2002) - Everett Lewis

M
Margins (2022)
Modern Angels (2000) - Roy Wallace
Mondo New York (1988)
Mannen som elsket Yngve (2008)

N
 (2001)
New York Doll (2005, documentary)
Night of the Demons
La Femme Nikita (1990) Luc Besson

O
One Nine Nine Four (2009)
Out of the Blue (1980)
Outsider (1997)

P
Panic High School (1978)
Pank Nije Mrtav (2011)
Planet Love  (2000) - Roy Wallace
Population: 1 (1986) - Rene Daalder
Pump up the Volume (1990) - Allan Moyle
Punk as Fuck  (1997) - Roy Wallace
Punk: Attitude (2005, documentary) - Don Letts
Punk In Love (2009)
Punk Love (2006)
Punk Rock  (1977, Adult Film/ Crime Drama) Carter Stevens 
Punk Rock Holocaust (2003)
The Punk Rock Movie  (also known as The Punk Rock Movie from England) (1978, documentary) - Don Letts
The Punk Singer (2013, documentary) - Kathleen Hanna
Punks (1984) - Sara Yaknni and Alberto Gieco
Punk's Dead (2016)
Punk's Not Dead (2007, documentary)
Pinkel (1982 film) by Dick Rijneke

R
Rad (1986) - Hal Needham
Reform School Girls (1986) - Tom DeSimone
Refused Are Fucking Dead (2006, documentary)
Repo Man (1984) Alex Cox
The Return of the Living Dead (1985)
Rise Above: The Tribe 8 Documentary (2003, documentary)
RISEN: A History of Amebix  (2008) - Roy Wallace
Roadkill (1989)
Rock 'n' Roll High School (1979) - Allan Arkush
Rodrigo D: No Future (1990) - Víctor Gaviria
Rude Boy (1980)
The Runaways (2010) - Floria Sigismondi

S
S.F.W. (1994)
She's Real, Worse Than Queer (1997, documentary) - Lucy Thane
Shock Treatment (1980)
Shonen Merikensack (2009)
Shooting at the Moon (2003) - Jesse Richards
Shuffle (1981)
Sid and Nancy (aka Sid and Nancy: Love Kills) (1986) - Alex Cox
Skinhead Attitude
SLC Punk! (1999)
Smithereens (1982) - Susan Seidelman, Richard Hell
Spidarlings (2016) - Selene Kapsaski
Straight to Hell (1987) - Alex Cox
Suburbia (1984)  - Penelope Spheeris
subUrbia (1996) - Richard Linklater
Subway (1985) - Luc Besson
Summer of Sam (1999) - Spike Lee
Surf Nazis Must Die (1987) Peter George

T
Tank Girl (1995) - Rachel Talalay
Tapeheads (1988)
Taqwacore: The Birth of Punk Islam (2009)
The Taqwacores (2010)
Terminal City Ricochet (1990)
Terror Firmer (1999)
There Is No Authority But Yourself (2006) - Alexander Oey; documentary about the history of Crass
The House of Tomorrow (2017)
Thrashin' (1986)
Threat (2006)
Times Square (1980)
Tjenare Kungen (2005)
Trainspotting (1996)
Tromeo and Juliet (1996) - a punk version of the Shakespeare classic, co-written by James Gunn
Trying It At Home (2014)

U
Up in Smoke (1978)
Urban Struggle (documentary)
Urgh! A Music War (1981, documentary)

V
Valley Girl (1983)
Vennaskond. Millennium (1998) - Tõnu Trubetsky

W
Wassup Rockers (2005) - Larry Clark
We Are the Best! (2013)
We Jam Econo (2005, documentary)
We're Outta Here! (1997)
What to Do in Case of Fire? (2001) - Gregor Schnitzler
What We Do Is Secret (2008) Rodger Grossman
Who Killed Nancy? (2009)
Wild Zero (2000)

X
X: The Unheard Music (documentary 1986)

Y
The Yo-Yo Gang (1992) - G. B. Jones
You Weren't There: A History of Chicago Punk, 1977-1984 (2007) Joe Losurdo Christina Tillman

See also
Cyberpunk
Japanese cyberpunk
List of cyberpunk works
List of skinhead films
No Wave Cinema
Remodernist Film
Steampunk
List of steampunk works

References

Punk